Nemanja Soković (Serbian Cyrillic: Немања Соковић; born 8 May 1996) is a professional Serbian footballer who plays as a forward for Cypriot Second Division club PAEEK.

Career
Born in Novi Sad, Nemanja started his career playing for ČSK Čelarevo. Later he played for Teleoptik, Radnički Šid, Cement Beočin, and Crvena Zvezda NS.

Nitra
Soković made his professional Fortuna Liga debut for Nitra against Železiarne Podbrezová on February 16, 2019, he started and assisted on the opening goal of the match.

Concordia Chiajna
After playing for Romanian Liga II side Ripensia Timișoara, Soković signed a contract in January 2022 with the Concordia Chiajna, a team from the same league.

References

External links
 FC Nitra official club profile 
 
 
 Futbalnet profile 

1996 births
Living people
Footballers from Novi Sad
Serbian footballers
Serbian expatriate footballers
Association football forwards
FK ČSK Čelarevo players
FK Teleoptik players
FK Radnički Šid players
FK Cement Beočin players
FK Crvena Zvezda Novi Sad players
FC Nitra players
FC Ripensia Timișoara players
CS Concordia Chiajna players
PAEEK players
Cypriot Second Division players
Serbian SuperLiga players
Slovak Super Liga players
Liga II players
Expatriate footballers in Slovakia
Serbian expatriate sportspeople in Slovakia
Expatriate footballers in Romania
Serbian expatriate sportspeople in Romania